Pak Tam is a village in Pak Tam Chung, Sai Kung Peninsula, Hong Kong.

Administration
Pak Tam is a recognized village under the New Territories Small House Policy.

History
Pak Tam Chung was described as consisting of six villages in 1911 with fewer than 405 inhabitants: Wong Yi Chau, Pak Tam, Sheung Yiu, Tsak Yue Wu, Wong Keng Tei and Tsam Chuk Wan. The six villages were all inhabited by Hakka people, with the exception of two hamlets in Pak Tam.

References

External links

 Delineation of area of existing village Pak Tam (Sai Kung) for election of resident representative (2019 to 2022)

Villages in Sai Kung District, Hong Kong
Sai Kung Peninsula